The play-off round of the 2019 AFC Asian Cup qualification was played from 2 June to 11 October 2016.

Format
A total of 11 teams (the four lowest-ranked fourth-placed teams and the seven fifth-placed teams of the Asian Cup qualifying second round) competed in the play-off round. Originally, 12 teams were supposed to compete, but there were only seven instead of eight fifth-placed teams after Indonesia were disqualified due to FIFA suspension.

The play-off round consisted of two rounds of home-and-away two-legged play-off matches to determine the final eight qualifiers for the Asian Cup qualifying third round:
Round 1: The ten highest-seeded teams were drawn into five ties. The five winners advanced to the Asian Cup qualifying third round, while the five losers entered Round 2.
Round 2: The six teams (the lowest-seeded team and the five Round 1 losers) were drawn into three ties. The three winners advanced to the Asian Cup qualifying third round, while the three losers were eligible to enter the AFC Solidarity Cup.

The five Round 1 winners and three Round 2 winners joined the 16 teams which advanced directly from the Asian Cup qualifying second round to the third round, to compete for the final 12 slots in the 2019 AFC Asian Cup.

The three Round 2 losers joined the six teams which lost in the Asian Cup qualifying first round, to compete for the 2016 AFC Solidarity Cup.

Qualified teams

Seeding 
The draw for the play-off round was held on 7 April 2016, 15:00 MYT (UTC+8), at the AFC House in Kuala Lumpur, Malaysia.

The teams were seeded based on their results in the Asian Cup qualifying second round.

In Round 1, each tie contained a team from Pot 1 and a team from Pot 2, with the team from Pot 1 hosting the first leg.

In Round 2, there were no seeding. As the draw was held before Round 1 was played, the identities of the Round 1 losers were not known at the time of the draw.

Matches
Each tie was played on a home-and-away two-legged basis. The away goals rule, extra time (away goals do not apply in extra time) and penalty shoot-out were used to decide the winner if necessary (Regulations Article 10.3).

Round 1
The first legs were played on 2 June, and the second legs were played on 6–7 June 2016.

|}
Note: Timor-Leste were ordered by the AFC to forfeit both matches against Malaysia due to the use of falsified documents for their players. Both matches originally ended as 3–0 wins to Malaysia.

Cambodia won 4–2 on aggregate and advanced to the Asian Cup qualifying third round. Chinese Taipei entered round 2.

Yemen won 4–0 on aggregate and advanced to the Asian Cup qualifying third round. Maldives entered round 2.

Tajikistan won 6–0 on aggregate and advanced to the Asian Cup qualifying third round. Bangladesh entered round 2.

Malaysia won 6–0 on aggregate and advanced to the Asian Cup qualifying third round. Timor-Leste entered round 2.

India won 7–1 on aggregate and advanced to the Asian Cup qualifying third round. Laos entered round 2.

Round 2
The first legs were played on 6 September and 8 October, and the second legs were played on 10 and 11 October 2016.

|}

Maldives won 5–1 on aggregate and advanced to the Asian Cup qualifying third round. Laos were eligible to enter the Solidarity Cup.

Bhutan won 3–1 on aggregate and advanced to the Asian Cup qualifying third round. Bangladesh were eligible to enter the Solidarity Cup.

Chinese Taipei won 4–2 on aggregate and advanced to the Asian Cup qualifying third round. Timor-Leste were eligible to enter the Solidarity Cup.

Goalscorers

Notes

References

External links
, the-AFC.com
AFC Asian Cup UAE 2019, stats.the-AFC.com

QualP
P
June 2016 sports events in Asia
September 2016 sports events in Asia
October 2016 sports events in Asia